Stockport County F.C. is an English professional association football club based in the town of Stockport. Founded in 1883 as Heaton Norris Rovers the clubs first manager was Fred Stewart who would manage Stockport for over 16 years making him the longest-serving manager in the clubs history.

The club has had 51 permanent managers. The first foreign manager of the club was the German, Bert Trautmann who was appointed in 1965.

The club's current manager is Dave Challinor, who took over from Simon Rusk in November 2021.

List of managers 
Information correct after match played on 18 April 2022. Only competitive matches are counted, except the abandoned 1939–40 Football League season and matches in Wartime Leagues and Cups.
Key
 Names of caretaker managers are supplied where known, and the names of caretaker managers are highlighted in italics and marked with an asterisk (*).
 Names of player-managers are supplied where known, and are marked with a double-dagger.

Notes

References 
Specific

 
Stockport County F.C.